Patrick O'Neal (born September 14, 1967) is an American sportscaster and occasional actor. He has been serving as a studio host/reporter for Bally Sports West/SoCal. He is also the secondary TV play-by-play announcer for the Los Angeles Angels whenever Matt Vasgersian or Wayne Randazzo is not available for telecasts.

Life
O'Neal is the son of actor Ryan O'Neal and actress Leigh Taylor-Young. He is the half-brother of Griffin O'Neal, Tatum O'Neal and Redmond O'Neal. His paternal ancestry is Irish, English, and Ashkenazi Jewish.

He has two daughters from his relationship with actress Rebecca De Mornay.

Broadcast career
Most of his appearances come during pregame and postgame shows of the Los Angeles Angels and Los Angeles Kings. He also provides game breaks for Fox College Football.
He was a studio host for Fox College Football for FX and in game highlights for Fox NFL Sunday.

On August 21 and August 28 of 2005, he was the studio host of Fox Saturday Baseball when regular host Jeanne Zelasko was on maternity leave, and he was a sideline reporter for two NFL on Fox games during the 2005 NFL Season. He was also the dugout reporter for Games 3 and 5 of the 2005 National League Championship Series and Game 5 of the 2005 American League Championship Series. For one season he was the ingame highlights host for Fox NFL Sunday before being succeeded by Joel Klatt. Since 2021, O’Neal has been the secondary TV play-by-play commentator with the Los Angeles Angels alongside Mark Gubicza whenever Matt Vasgersian is not available. Whenever Vasgersian is broadcasting for the Angels, O’Neal works as the sideline reporter during the Angels telecast or studio host for the team’s pre-game/post-game show.

Filmography
China Beach (1989) - C.O. 
Daughter of the Streets (1990, TV movie) - Alex 
Die Hard 2 (1990) - Cpl. Telford (Blue Light Team)
Beverly Hills, 90210 (1990) - George Sudaris
Pensacola: Wings of Gold (1998) - Hondo 
A Table for One (1999) - Brad
Just for the Time Being (2000) - Billy Fischer
Pacific Blue (2000) - Thomas J. Craiden
Lost in the Pershing Point Hotel (2000) - Angry Bartender
The Right Temptation (2000) - Carl
Wild Hogs (2007) - Family Dad

References

External links

Patrick O'Neal at Twitter

1967 births
American male film actors
American people of English descent
American people of Irish descent
American people of Jewish descent
American television reporters and correspondents
College basketball announcers in the United States
College football announcers
Living people
Los Angeles Clippers announcers
Los Angeles Dodgers announcers
Los Angeles Lakers announcers
Major League Baseball broadcasters
National Basketball Association broadcasters
National Football League announcers
People from Greater Los Angeles